St. Nicholas of Tolentine Church is a historic church in Atlantic City, Atlantic County, New Jersey, United States. It was built in 1905 and added to the National Register of Historic Places on February 2, 2001, for its significance in architecture. It is one of four churches of The Parish of Saint Monica in the Roman Catholic Diocese of Camden.

Description

St. Nicholas of Tolentine's 1916 Moller pipe organ (Opus 2138) was rebuilt by Peragallo in 2006 and will be restored over the course of the next several years. The organ at St. Nicholas is one of the busiest in the country, playing at all Masses, at several choir rehearsals per week, and at a host of weddings, funerals, and concerts.

At each of the eleven regularly scheduled Masses, the post-Vatican II Mass is celebrated with music.

John P. O'Neill, an American counter-terrorism expert, working for the FBI, and killed in the September 11 attacks, once served as an altar boy in this church and is buried in the churchyard.

See also
 National Register of Historic Places listings in Atlantic County, New Jersey

References

External links
 The Parish of St. Monica Official Site

Churches in Atlantic County, New Jersey
Buildings and structures in Atlantic City, New Jersey
Roman Catholic churches completed in 1905
National Register of Historic Places in Atlantic County, New Jersey
Churches on the National Register of Historic Places in New Jersey
Roman Catholic Diocese of Camden
New Jersey Register of Historic Places
1905 establishments in New Jersey
20th-century Roman Catholic church buildings in the United States
Romanesque Revival architecture in New Jersey